Mario Manzoni (born 14 July 1969) is an Italian former professional racing cyclist, who rode in nine editions of the Giro d'Italia, winning one stage in 1997. He now works as a directeur sportif for UCI Continental team .

Major results

1988
 1st Piccolo Giro di Lombardia
1991
 3rd GP Industria Artigianato e Commercio Carnaghese
 5th Gran Premio Città di Camaiore
 6th Giro di Romagna
1992
 1st Trofeo Masferrer
 3rd Circuito de Getxo
1994
 1st Stage 3 Tirreno–Adriatico
1995
 7th Omloop Het Volk
 9th GP du canton d'Argovie
1996
 1st Stage 2 Tour de Romandie
1997
 1st Stage 8 Giro d'Italia
1998
 1st Stage 3 Giro del Trentino
 2nd GP Industria & Artigianato di Larciano
 3rd Cholet-Pays de Loire
 5th Giro della Provincia di Siracusa
 8th Giro di Toscana
1999
 6th Coppa Bernocchi
 9th Giro di Romagna
2000
 10th Criterium d'Abruzzo
2001
 8th Giro della Provincia di Siracusa
2002
 2nd G.P. Costa degli Etruschi
 5th Trofeo dell'Etna
 10th Milan–San Remo
2003
 3rd Trofeo dell'Etna

References

External links
 

1969 births
Living people
Italian male cyclists
Cyclists from the Province of Bergamo